The Imbert Prize was instituted in 2005, and is awarded annually by the Association of Security Consultants (ASC) for the development of ideas for the advancement of risk and security management in the UK.

The prize consists of three categories: 
 Best academic dissertation
 Most notable contribution in the security industry in the preceding year 
 The ASC member that has made the most significant contribution to independent security consultancy.

The prize is named after Lord Imbert, a patron of the ASC, who was Commissioner of Scotland Yard 1987-1993, and was a prominent figure in debates about security and policing.

Imbert Prize recipients

See also 
 The Security Institute

References
14.  https://www.risk-uk.com/peter-finch-csyp-wins-ascs-prestigious-imbert-prize-for-second-year-in-succession/

Risk UK 2015-07-21
British awards
Academic awards
Awards for scholarly publications